The International Council on Systems Engineering (INCOSE; pronounced in-co-see) is a not-for-profit membership organization and professional society in the field of systems engineering. INCOSE has about 17000 members including individual members, corporate members and student members. INCOSE's main activities include its conferences, publications, local chapters, certifications and technical working groups. 

The INCOSE International Symposium is generally held in July in the United States or another country, and the INCOSE International Workshop is held in January in the United States.  

Currently, there are about 70 local INCOSE chapters globally with most chapters outside the United States representing entire countries, while chapters within the United States represent cities or regions. 

INCOSE organizes about 50 technical working groups with international membership, aimed at collaboration and the creation of INCOSE products, printed and online, in the field of Systems engineering. Working groups exist for topics within systems engineering practice, systems engineering in particular industries and systems engineering's relationship to other related disciplines.

INCOSE produces two main periodicals: the journal, and the practitioner magazine, along with a number of individual published works, including the INCOSE Handbook. In collaboration with the IEEE Computer Society and the Systems Engineering Research Council (SERC), INCOSE produces and maintains the online Systems Engineering Book of Knowledge (SEBoK)], a wiki-style reference open to contributions from anyone, but with content controlled and managed by an editorial board. 

INCOSE certifies systems engineers through its three-tier certification process. Certification requires a combination of education, years of experience and passing an examination based on the INCOSE Systems Engineering Handbook.  

INCOSE is a member organization of the Federation of Enterprise Architecture Professional Organizations (FEAPO), a worldwide association of professional organizations formed to advance the discipline of Enterprise Architecture.

Mission, Vision and Goals 
The stated vision of INCOSE is "A better world through a systems approach" and its mission is "To address complex societal and technical challenges by enabling, promoting and advancing systems engineering and systems approaches. The organization's goals are focused on the creation and dissemination of systems engineering information, promoting international collaboration and promoting the profession of Systems engineering.

Publications and products

Publications and products 
 INCOSE Systems Engineering Handbook
 Systems Engineering
 INSIGHT Practitioner Journal
 Metrics Guidebook for Integrated Systems and Product Development
 I-pub publication database
 Systems Engineering Tools Database

Standards 
INCOSE's International Council on Systems Engineering Standards Technical Committee (STC) is working to advance and harmonize systems engineering standards used worldwide. Some of the notable standards the STC has been involved with are:
 ECSS-E-10 Space Engineering - Systems Engineering Part 1B: Requirements and process, 18 Nov 2004
 ECSS-E-10 Space Engineering - Systems Engineering Part 6A: Functional and technical specifications, 09 Jan 2004
 ECSS-E-10 Space Engineering - Systems Engineering Part 7A: Product data exchange, 25 August 2004
 ISO/IEC/IEEE 15288: 2015 - System and Software Life Cycle Processes
 OMG Systems Modeling Language (OMG SysML), July 2006

Awards 
 INCOSE Pioneer Award: annual prize for people who have made significant pioneering contributions to the field of Systems Engineering

References

External links 
INCOSE

Organizations established in 1990
Engineering societies
Systems engineering
Systems science societies